Karkare (Devanagari: करकरे) is a surname commonly used by members of Indian Marathi Brahmin community. Notable people with the surname include:

 Hemant Karkare (1954–2008), Indian police chief
 Vishnu Ramkrishna Karkare ( 1910–1974), Indian political activist

Indian surnames